Emil Platen (born 16 September 1925) is a German musicologist and conductor.

Life 
Born in Düsseldorf, Platen received his first music lessons at the Jugendmusikschule Düsseldorf in the disciplines violin and music theory/composition (with Reger's student Otto Leonhardt). After his examination as a choral conductor, he resumed his musicological studies at the University of Bonn in 1951, which he completed in 1957 with a dissertation on the "Chorische Choralbearungen von Joh. Bach" which won him his doctorate. During his studies he worked as a violist in various ensembles in Bonn and at Westdeutscher Rundfunk Köln. Further stages in his professional career were: 1959 research assistant at the Beethoven-Archiv Bonn, 1963 academic music director and 1971 honorary professor for musicology at the University of Bonn. In 1969 he founded the North Rhine-Westphalia Youth Symphony Orchestra together with Hans-Josef Menke. After his retirement, he was a lecturer for music history at the Hochschule für Musik und Tanz Köln from 1994 to 2003.

His research focuses on the theory of musical forms and the works of J. S. Bach and L. van Beethoven.

Publications 
 Untersuchungen zur Struktur der chorischen Choralbearbeitung Johann Sebastian Bachs, Diss. Bonn 1957,
 Die Matthäus-Passion von Johann Sebastian Bach. Werkeinführung, Munich and Kassel 1991, 4. verb. u. erg. Aufl. 2012
 Bachs lutherische Messen.
 Studien zu Bach und Beethoven, Chemnitz 2000.
 Ludwig van Beethoven, ed. of several volumes of the Urtext edition and complete edition. Munich: Henle

Literature 
 Martella Gutiérrez-Denhoff (ed.): Collegium Musicologicum. Festschrift Emil Platen zum Sechzigsten Geburtstag. Beethoven-Archiv, Bonn 1985.
 Bernhard Hartmann: Der Bonner Musikwissenschaftler Emil Platen wird 90 Jahre. General-Anzeiger. Bonn, 16 September 2015.

Sources 
 Riemann Musiklexikon, Supplementary volume, personal part, Mainz 1975
 Honegger-Massenkeil, Das Große Lexikon der Musik, vol. 6, Freiburg 1976
 Die Musik in Geschichte und Gegenwart, 2nd edition, personal part
 Kürschners Deutscher Gelehrten-Kalender

References 

German conductors (music)
20th-century German musicologists
German classical violists
Choral conductors
1925 births
Living people
Musicians from Düsseldorf